David Greig was the supermarket (initially grocery shop) chain founded by the Greig family of Hornsey, north London. With its headquarters at Atlantic Road, Brixton (and later at Waterloo Road, London) and grocery shops across southern England, it was a rival to the Sainsbury's chain, John and Mary Sainsbury having opened their first grocery shop in Holborn one year earlier. A deep personal rivalry developed between the two families, because of acrimonious feelings about the Greigs' alleged betrayal of a verbal agreement regarding the purchasing of sites for development.

The David Greig chain is considered to have been established in 1870, when the wife of a Hornsey cabinet maker of Scots birth opened a small provisions shop at 32 High Street, Hornsey. By 1881 her son David Greig had joined her in the business and described himself as a 'provision dealer' in the census of that year. The business thrived and wishing to expand beyond Hornsey, Greig opened his first shop at 54-58 Atlantic Road, Brixton in 1888, initially "anchoring" the nascent Brixton Market, which started in Atlantic Road in the 1870s and was so successful that it spread to Brixton Road before being relocated to Brixton Station Road plus several purpose built covered arcades and finally also Electric Avenue, to reduce congestion and allow further growth. Around 1890 a second shop was opened at nearby Loughborough Junction, near Brixton. This was probably the shop at 232 Coldharbour Lane where a wooden ‘David Greig’ fascia with ‘Brilliant cut’ gilded lettering in the distinctive serif typeface of the chain, was uncovered in 2020. 

By the late 1960s, there were more than 220 Greig shops across the south of the country, all trading under the David Greig brand. However, the company was sold to Fitch lovell and merged into Fitch Lovell's own Key Markets supermarket brand in 1972 after crippling death duties were incurred when several of the men in the family died in quick succession, with inheritance tax obligatory on their entirely private holdings. Key Markets was later bought by Gateway, and eventually rebranded as Somerfield, although several of the larger stores were taken over by ASDA, including the Sturry Road site, near Canterbury. This was in turn bought by the Co-operative Group. Each of these changes included considerable restructuring, so many ex-Greig stores may now be in different ownership. In 1992 Gateway rebranded two of its stores, including one in Bristol, with the David Greig name.

David Greig was a notable philanthropist, and, grateful for the education he received at the local parish school in Hornsey village, left educational trusts for the benefit of Hornsey and the community. These have contributed to the Greig City Academy in Hornsey.

A commemorative plaque has been placed on 32 Hornsey High Street, the site of the very first Greig shop. The David Greig shop at 54-58 Atlantic Road, Brixton, is no longer a supermarket, but the frontage, containing a "DG" cypher, remains relatively original, and although the full name has been removed from the facade it is still visible in the mosaic floor outside the recessed shop entrance.
Two well-preserved examples of David Greig shops have been listed Grade II by Historic England - firstly in 2000 the branch at 177 Streatham High Road (for listing description see: https://historicengland.org.uk/listing/the-list/list-entry/1380345?section=official-listing) and later in 2017, No.65 Lordship Lane in East Dulwich both largely retain their authentic late 19th-century interiors.

The old David Greig building at 23 St Georges Street Canterbury (now Superdrug) was designed by Robert Paine and Partners in 1952 and became a listed building in 1995 under the English Heritage building protection scheme. There is an inscription on the wall, in memory of DAVID GREIG, founder and DAVID ROSS GREIG.  When Superdrug refurbished the store in the 1990s and the marble replaced, a stonemason was employed to re-create the inscription. It can still be seen today.

Film of the Canterbury store from about 1955 is held in the collection of The Cinema Museum London Ref HM0355.

There is another facility in Alcester (Warwickshire) in memory of his wife Hannah Susan. The current sports, arts and community facilities are called The Greig and are managed by the Hannah Susan Greig Memorial Company Limited.

The family tableaux is located in Magpie Hall Lane cemetery, Bromley, London.ent.

A David Greig shop sign was uncovered at No.257 Old Kent Road after the current occupiers carried out refurbishments in November 2019. 

Detail of David Greig tiling at 16 Half Moon Lane, London.

See also
 List of supermarket chains in the United Kingdom

References

External links
 Photo of mosaic floor outside recessed entrance to first shop, in Atlantic Road Brixton, as seen in Aug 2003

Defunct supermarkets of the United Kingdom
1870 establishments in the United Kingdom